Colby Chandler may refer to:
Colby Chandler (CEO), former CEO of Eastman Kodak
Colby Chandler (All My Children), a character on U.S. soap opera All My Children